The Chairman of the Island Council is a position on the Island Council, which is the legislature of the Pitcairn Islands. Although the position is directly elected, the holder only sits on the Council ex officio.

References

 
Pitcairn
Pitcairn